Clubul Sportiv Triumf Bârca, commonly known as CS Triumf Bârca, or simply as Triumf Bârca, is a Romanian amateur football club based in Bârca, Dolj County and founded in 2008.

They currently play in the Liga V, Dolj County.

History 

The club was founded in the summer of 2008 after the Futsal team FC Craiova moved to Bârca. At the end of the very first season in history, it succeeded to win the Liga IV Dolj County Championship. But at the play-off that followed, to decide the promoted team to the Liga III, it lost in front of CS Albota, the winner of the Liga IV Argeș County Championship.

But soon after this, the mass withdrawal of teams from the Liga III championship because of the financial crisis, an opportunity arose that could not be missed, so it enrolled for the 2009–10 Liga III season. At the end of the first part of the championship, te club sees itself on top of the table, 1st, in front of more better rated clubs, such as Alro Slatina, FC Târgovişte, FC Caracal, or even CS Albota, the club in front of whom it lost the promotion.

The club plays its matches in Craiova since the promotion to the Liga III, on the Chimia Stadium, because the local stadium in Bârca doesn't meet the requirements.

After it relegated in 2011 from the Liga III, the club moved back to Bârca and enrolled in the Liga VI.

Honours
Liga IV – Dolj County
Winners (1): 2008–09

References
TRIUMF BÂRCA: „Extratereştrii” seriei IV
Marian Bâcu răspunde întrebărilor puse de cititorii Liga2.ro
TRIUMF BÂRCA: Statistica turului de campionat

Association football clubs established in 2008
Football clubs in Dolj County
Liga III clubs
Liga IV clubs
2008 establishments in Romania